A trade union (British English) or labor union (American English), often simply referred to as a union, is an organisation of workers intent on "maintaining or improving the conditions of their employment", such as attaining better wages and benefits, improving working conditions, improving safety standards, establishing complaint procedures, developing rules governing status of employees (rules governing promotions, just-cause conditions for termination) and protecting and increasing the bargaining power of workers.

Trade unions typically fund their head office and legal team functions through regularly imposed fees called union dues. The delegate staff of the trade union representation in the workforce are usually made up of workplace volunteers who are often appointed by members in democratic elections. The trade union, through an elected leadership and bargaining committee, bargains with the employer on behalf of its members, known as the rank-and-file, and negotiates labour contracts (collective bargaining agreements) with employers.

Unions may organize a particular section of skilled or unskilled workers (craft unionism), a cross-section of workers from various trades (general unionism), or an attempt to organize all workers within a particular industry (industrial unionism). The agreements negotiated by a union are binding on the rank-and-file members and the employer, and in some cases on other non-member workers. Trade unions traditionally have a constitution which details the governance of their bargaining unit and also have governance at various levels of government depending on the industry that binds them legally to their negotiations and functioning.

Originating in Great Britain, trade unions became popular in many countries during the Industrial Revolution. Trade unions may be composed of individual workers, professionals, past workers, students, apprentices or the unemployed. Trade union density, or the percentage of workers belonging to a trade union, is highest in the Nordic countries.

Definition 

Since the publication of the History of Trade Unionism (1894) by Sidney and Beatrice Webb, the predominant historical view is that a trade union "is a continuous association on wage earners for the purpose of maintaining or improving the conditions of their employment." Karl Marx described trade unions thus: "The value of labour -power constitutes the conscious and explicit foundation of the trade unions, whose importance for the ... working class can scarcely be overestimated. The trade unions aim at nothing less than to prevent the reduction of wages below the level that is traditionally maintained in the various branches of industry. That is to say, they wish to prevent the price of labour -power from falling below its value" (Capital V1, 1867, p. 1069). Early socialists also saw trade unions as a way to democratise the workplace, in order to capture political power.

A modern definition by the Australian Bureau of Statistics states that a trade union is "an organisation consisting predominantly of employees, the principal activities of which include the negotiation of rates of pay and conditions of employment for its members."

Recent historical research by Bob James puts forward the view that trade unions are part of a broader movement of benefit societies, which includes medieval guilds, Freemasons, Oddfellows, friendly societies, and other fraternal organisations.

History

Trade guilds 
Following the unification of the city-states in Assyria and Sumer by Sargon of Akkad into a single empire circa 2334 BC, common Mesopotamian standards for length, area, volume, weight, and time used by artisan guilds in each city was promulgated by Naram-Sin of Akkad (c. 2254–2218 BC), Sargon's grandson, including for shekels. Codex Hammurabi Law 234 (c. 1755–1750 BC) stipulated a 2-shekel prevailing wage for each 60-gur (300-bushel) vessel constructed in an employment contract between a shipbuilder and a ship-owner. Law 275 stipulated a ferry rate of 3-gerah per day on a charterparty between a ship charterer and a shipmaster. Law 276 stipulated a 2-gerah per day freight rate on a contract of affreightment between a charterer and shipmaster, while Law 277 stipulated a -shekel per day freight rate for a 60-gur vessel. In 1816, an archeological excavation in Minya, Egypt (under an Eyalet of the Ottoman Empire) produced a Nerva–Antonine dynasty-era tablet from the ruins of the Temple of Antinous in Antinoöpolis, that prescribed the rules and membership dues of a burial society collegium established in Lanuvium, in approximately 133 AD during the reign of Hadrian (117–138) of the Roman Empire.

A collegium was any association in ancient Rome that acted as a legal entity. Following the passage of the Lex Julia during the reign of Julius Caesar (49–44 BC), and their reaffirmation during the reign of Caesar Augustus (27 BC–14 AD), collegia required the approval of the Roman Senate or the Roman emperor in order to be authorized as legal bodies. Ruins at Lambaesis date the formation of burial societies among Roman Army soldiers and Roman Navy mariners to the reign of Septimius Severus (193–211) in 198 AD. In September 2011, archeological investigations done at the site of the artificial harbor Portus in Rome revealed inscriptions in a shipyard constructed during the reign of Trajan (98–117) indicating the existence of a shipbuilders guild. Rome's La Ostia port was home to a guildhall for a corpus naviculariorum, a collegium of merchant mariners. Collegium also included fraternities of Roman priests overseeing ritual sacrifices, practicing augury, keeping scriptures, arranging festivals, and maintaining specific religious cults.

Modern trade unions 
While a commonly held mistaken view holds modern trade unionism to be a product of Marxism, the earliest modern trade unions predate Marx's Communist Manifesto (1848) by almost a century (and Marx's writings themselves frequently address the prior existence of the workers' movements of his time), with the first recorded labour strike in the United States by the Philadelphia printers in 1786. The origins of modern trade unions can be traced back to 18th-century Britain, where the Industrial Revolution drew masses of people, including dependents, peasants and immigrants into cities. Britain had ended the practice of serfdom in 1574, but the vast majority of people remained as tenant-farmers on estates owned by the landed aristocracy. This transition was not merely one of relocation from rural to urban environs; rather, the nature of industrial work created a new class of "worker". A farmer worked the land, raised animals and grew crop, and either owned the land or paid rent, but ultimately sold a product and had control over his life and work. As industrial workers, however, the workers sold their work as labour and took directions from employers, giving up part of their freedom and self-agency in the service of a master. The critics of the new arrangement would call this "wage slavery", but the term that persisted was a new form of human relations: employment. Unlike farmers, workers often had less control over their jobs; without job security or a promise of an on-going relationship with their employers, they lacked some control over the work they performed or how it impacted their health and life. It is in this context, then, that modern trade unions emerge.

In the cities, trade unions encountered a large hostility in their early existence from employers and government groups; at the time, unions and unionists were regularly prosecuted under various restraint of trade and conspiracy statutes. This pool of unskilled and semi-skilled labour spontaneously organized in fits and starts throughout its beginnings, and would later be an important arena for the development of trade unions. Trade unions have sometimes been seen as successors to the guilds of medieval Europe, though the relationship between the two is disputed, as the masters of the guilds employed workers (apprentices and journeymen) who were not allowed to organize.

Trade unions and collective bargaining were outlawed from no later than the middle of the 14th century, when the Ordinance of Labourers was enacted in the Kingdom of England, but their way of thinking was the one that endured down the centuries, inspiring evolutions and advances in thinking which eventually gave workers more power. As collective bargaining and early worker unions grew with the onset of the Industrial Revolution, the government began to clamp down on what it saw as the danger of popular unrest at the time of the Napoleonic Wars. In 1799, the Combination Act was passed, which banned trade unions and collective bargaining by British workers. Although the unions were subject to often severe repression until 1824, they were already widespread in cities such as London. Workplace militancy had also manifested itself as Luddism and had been prominent in struggles such as the 1820 Rising in Scotland, in which 60,000 workers went on a general strike, which was soon crushed. Sympathy for the plight of the workers brought repeal of the acts in 1824, although the Combination Act 1825 severely restricted their activity.

By the 1810s, the first labour organisations to bring together workers of divergent occupations were formed. Possibly the first such union was the General Union of Trades, also known as the Philanthropic Society, founded in 1818 in Manchester. The latter name was to hide the organisation's real purpose in a time when trade unions were still illegal.

National general unions

The first attempts at setting up a national general union were made in the 1820s and 30s. The National Association for the Protection of Labour was established in 1830 by John Doherty, after an apparently unsuccessful attempt to create a similar national presence with the National Union of Cotton-spinners. The Association quickly enrolled approximately 150 unions, consisting mostly of textile related unions, but also including mechanics, blacksmiths, and various others. Membership rose to between 10,000 and 20,000 individuals spread across the five counties of Lancashire, Cheshire, Derbyshire, Nottinghamshire and Leicestershire within a year. To establish awareness and legitimacy, the union started the weekly Voice of the People publication, having the declared intention "to unite the productive classes of the community in one common bond of union."

In 1834, the Welsh socialist Robert Owen established the Grand National Consolidated Trades Union. The organisation attracted a range of socialists from Owenites to revolutionaries and played a part in the protests after the Tolpuddle Martyrs' case, but soon collapsed.

More permanent trade unions were established from the 1850s, better resourced but often less radical. The London Trades Council was founded in 1860, and the Sheffield Outrages spurred the establishment of the Trades Union Congress in 1868, the first long-lived national trade union center. By this time, the existence and the demands of the trade unions were becoming accepted by liberal middle-class opinion. In Principles of Political Economy (1871) John Stuart Mill wrote:

If it were possible for the working classes, by combining among themselves, to raise or keep up the general rate of wages, it needs hardly be said that this would be a thing not to be punished, but to be welcomed and rejoiced at. Unfortunately the effect is quite beyond attainment by such means. The multitudes who compose the working class are too numerous and too widely scattered to combine at all, much more to combine effectually. If they could do so, they might doubtless succeed in diminishing the hours of labour, and obtaining the same wages for less work. They would also have a limited power of obtaining, by combination, an increase of general wages at the expense of profits.Beyond this claim Mill also argued that, because individual workers have no basis for assessing the wages for a particular task, labor unions would lead to greater efficiency of the market system.

Legalization, expansion and recognition

British trade unions were finally legalized in 1872, after a Royal Commission on Trade Unions in 1867 agreed that the establishment of the organisations was to the advantage of both employers and employees.

This period also saw the growth of trade unions in other industrializing countries, especially the United States, Germany and France.

In the United States, the first effective nationwide labour organisation was the Knights of Labor, in 1869, which began to grow after 1880. Legalization occurred slowly as a result of a series of court decisions. The Federation of Organized Trades and Labor Unions began in 1881 as a federation of different unions that did not directly enroll workers. In 1886, it became known as the American Federation of Labor or AFL.

In Germany the Free Association of German Trade Unions was formed in 1897 after the conservative Anti-Socialist Laws of Chancellor Otto von Bismarck were repealed.

In France, labour organisation was illegal until 1884. The Bourse du Travail was founded in 1887 and merged with the Fédération nationale des syndicats (National Federation of Trade Unions) in 1895 to form the General Confederation of Labour.

In a number of countries during the 20th century, including in Canada, the United States and the United Kingdom, legislation was passed to provide for the voluntary or statutory recognition of a union by an employer.

Prevalence worldwide

The union density has been steadily declining from the OECD average of 35.9% in 1998 to 27.9% in the year 2018. The main reasons for these developments are a decline in manufacturing, increased globalization, and governmental policies.

The decline in manufacturing is the most direct one as it generally have been low- or unskilled workers who have benefited the most from trade unions. On the other hand, there might an increase in developing nations as OECD nations exported manufacturing industries to these markets. The second reason is globalization, which makes it harder for unions to maintain standards across countries. The last reason is governmental policies. These come from both sides of the political spectrum. In the UK and US, it has been mostly right-wing proposals that make it harder for unions to form or that limit their power. On the other side, there are many policies such as minimum wage, paid vacation, maternity/paternity leave, etc., that decrease the need to be in a union.

Structure and politics

Unions may organize a particular section of skilled workers (craft unionism, traditionally found in Australia, Canada, Denmark, Norway, Sweden, Switzerland, the UK and the US), a cross-section of workers from various trades (general unionism, traditionally found in Australia, Belgium, Canada, Denmark, Netherlands, the UK and the US), or attempt to organize all workers within a particular industry (industrial unionism, found in Australia, Canada, Germany, Finland, Norway, South Korea, Sweden, Switzerland, the UK and the US). These unions are often divided into "locals", and united in national federations. These federations themselves will affiliate with Internationals, such as the International Trade Union Confederation. However, in Japan, union organisation is slightly different due to the presence of enterprise unions, i.e. unions that are specific to a plant or company. These enterprise unions, however, join industry-wide federations which in turn are members of Rengo, the Japanese national trade union confederation.

In Western Europe, professional associations often carry out the functions of a trade union. In these cases, they may be negotiating for white-collar or professional workers, such as physicians, engineers or teachers. Typically such trade unions refrain from politics or pursue a more liberal politics than their blue-collar counterparts.

A union may acquire the status of a "juristic person" (an artificial legal entity), with a mandate to negotiate with employers for the workers it represents. In such cases, unions have certain legal rights, most importantly the right to engage in collective bargaining with the employer (or employers) over wages, working hours, and other terms and conditions of employment. The inability of the parties to reach an agreement may lead to industrial action, culminating in either strike action or management lockout, or binding arbitration. In extreme cases, violent or illegal activities may develop around these events.

In other circumstances, unions may not have the legal right to represent workers, or the right may be in question. This lack of status can range from non-recognition of a union to political or criminal prosecution of union activists and members, with many cases of violence and deaths having been recorded historically.

Unions may also engage in broader political or social struggle. Social Unionism encompasses many unions that use their organisational strength to advocate for social policies and legislation favourable to their members or to workers in general. As well, unions in some countries are closely aligned with political parties.

Unions are also delineated by the service model and the organizing model. The service model union focuses more on maintaining worker rights, providing services, and resolving disputes. Alternately, the organizing model typically involves full-time union organizers, who work by building up confidence, strong networks, and leaders within the workforce; and confrontational campaigns involving large numbers of union members. Many unions are a blend of these two philosophies, and the definitions of the models themselves are still debated.

In Britain, the perceived left-leaning nature of trade unions has resulted in the formation of a reactionary right-wing trade union called Solidarity which is supported by the far-right BNP. In Denmark, there are some newer apolitical "discount" unions who offer a very basic level of services, as opposed to the dominating Danish pattern of extensive services and organizing.

In contrast, in several European countries (e.g. Belgium, Denmark, the Netherlands and Switzerland), religious unions have existed for decades. These unions typically distanced themselves from some of the doctrines of orthodox Marxism, such as the preference of atheism and from rhetoric suggesting that employees' interests always are in conflict with those of employers. Some of these Christian unions have had some ties to centrist or conservative political movements and some do not regard strikes as acceptable political means for achieving employees' goals. In Poland, the biggest trade union Solidarity emerged as an anti-communist movement with religious nationalist overtones and today it supports the right-wing Law and Justice party.

Although their political structure and autonomy varies widely, union leaderships are usually formed through democratic elections. Some research, such as that conducted by the Australian Centre for Industrial Relations Research and Training, argues that unionized workers enjoy better conditions and wages than those who are not unionized.

International unions 
The oldest global trade union organisations include the World Federation of Trade Unions created in 1945. The largest trade union federation in the world is the Brussels-based International Trade Union Confederation (ITUC), created in 2006, which has approximately 309 affiliated organisations in 156 countries and territories, with a combined membership of 166 million. National and regional trade unions organizing in specific industry sectors or occupational groups also form global union federations, such as Union Network International, the International Transport Workers Federation, the International Federation of Journalists, the International Arts and Entertainment Alliance or Public Services International.

Labour law 
Union law varies from country to country, as does the function of unions. For example, German and Dutch unions have played a greater role in management decisions through participation in corporate boards and co-determination than have unions in the United States. Moreover, in the United States, collective bargaining is most commonly undertaken by unions directly with employers, whereas in Austria, Denmark, Germany or Sweden, unions most often negotiate with employers associations.

Concerning labour market regulation in the EU, Gold (1993) and Hall (1994) have identified three distinct systems of labour market regulation, which also influence the role that unions play:
 "In the Continental European System of labour market regulation, the government plays an important role as there is a strong legislative core of employee rights, which provides the basis for agreements as well as a framework for discord between unions on one side and employers or employers' associations on the other. This model was said to be found in EU core countries such as Belgium, France, Germany, the Netherlands and Italy, and it is also mirrored and emulated to some extent in the institutions of the EU, due to the relative weight that these countries had in the EU until the EU expansion by the inclusion of 10 new Eastern European member states in 2004.
 In the Anglo-Saxon System of labour market regulation, the government's legislative role is much more limited, which allows for more issues to be decided between employers and employees and any union or employers' associations which might represent these parties in the decision-making process. However, in these countries, collective agreements are not widespread; only a few businesses and a few sectors of the economy have a strong tradition of finding collective solutions in labour relations. Ireland and the UK belong to this category, and in contrast to the EU core countries above, these countries first joined the EU in 1973.
 In the Nordic System of labour market regulation, the government's legislative role is limited in the same way as in the Anglo-Saxon system. However, in contrast to the countries in the Anglo-Saxon system category, this is a much more widespread network of collective agreements, which covers most industries and most firms. This model was said to encompass Denmark, Finland, Norway and Sweden. Here, Denmark joined the EU in 1973, whereas Finland and Sweden joined in 1995."

The United States takes a more laissez-faire approach, setting some minimum standards but leaving most workers' wages and benefits to collective bargaining and market forces. Thus, it comes closest to the above Anglo-Saxon model. Also, the Eastern European countries that have recently entered into the EU come closest to the Anglo-Saxon model.

In contrast, in Germany, the relation between individual employees and employers is considered to be asymmetrical. In consequence, many working conditions are not negotiable due to a strong legal protection of individuals. However, the German flavor or works legislation has as its main objective to create a balance of power between employees organized in unions and employers organized in employers associations. This allows much wider legal boundaries for collective bargaining, compared to the narrow boundaries for individual negotiations. As a condition to obtain the legal status of a trade union, employee associations need to prove that their leverage is strong enough to serve as a counter-force in negotiations with employers. If such an employees association is competing against another union, its leverage may be questioned by unions and then evaluated in labour court. In Germany, only very few professional associations obtained the right to negotiate salaries and working conditions for their members, notably the medical doctors association  and the pilots association . The engineers association Verein Deutscher Ingenieure does not strive to act as a union, as it also represents the interests of engineering businesses.

Beyond the classification listed above, unions' relations with political parties vary. In many countries unions are tightly bonded, or even share leadership, with a political party intended to represent the interests of the working class. Typically this is a left-wing, socialist, or social democratic party, but many exceptions exist, including some of the aforementioned Christian unions. In the United States, trade unions are almost always aligned with the Democratic Party with a few exceptions. For example, the International Brotherhood of Teamsters has supported Republican Party candidates on a number of occasions and the Professional Air Traffic Controllers Organization (PATCO) endorsed Ronald Reagan in 1980. In Britain trade union movement's relationship with the Labour Party frayed as party leadership embarked on privatization plans at odds with what unions see as the worker's interests. However, it has strengthened once more after the Labour party's election of Ed Miliband, who beat his brother David Miliband to become leader of the party after Ed secured the trade union votes. Additionally, in the past, there was a group known as the Conservative Trade Unionists, or CTU, formed of people who sympathized with right wing Tory policy but were Trade Unionists.

Historically, the Republic of Korea has regulated collective bargaining by requiring employers to participate, but collective bargaining has only been legal if held in sessions before the lunar new year.

Shop types 
Companies that employ workers with a union generally operate on one of several models:
 A closed shop (US) or a "pre-entry closed shop" (UK) employs only people who are already union members. The compulsory hiring hall is an example of a closed shop—in this case the employer must recruit directly from the union, as well as the employee working strictly for unionized employers.
 A union shop (US) or a "post-entry closed shop" (UK) employs non-union workers as well, but sets a time limit within which new employees must join a union.
 An agency shop requires non-union workers to pay a fee to the union for its services in negotiating their contract. This is sometimes called the Rand formula.
 An open shop does not require union membership in employing or keeping workers. Where a union is active, workers who do not contribute to a union may include those who approve of the union contract (free riders) and those who do not. In the United States, state level right-to-work laws mandate the open shop in some states. In Germany only open shops are legal; that is, all discrimination based on union membership is forbidden. This affects the function and services of the union.

An EU case concerning Italy stated that, "The principle of trade union freedom in the Italian system implies recognition of the right of the individual not to belong to any trade union ("negative" freedom of association/trade union freedom), and the unlawfulness of discrimination liable to cause harm to non-unionized employees."

In Britain, previous to this EU jurisprudence, a series of laws introduced during the 1980s by Margaret Thatcher's government restricted closed and union shops. All agreements requiring a worker to join a union are now illegal. In the United States, the Taft–Hartley Act of 1947 outlawed the closed shop.

In 2006, the European Court of Human Rights found Danish closed-shop agreements to be in breach of Article 11 of the European Convention on Human Rights and Fundamental Freedoms. It was stressed that Denmark and Iceland were among a limited number of contracting states that continue to permit the conclusion of closed-shop agreements.

Impact

Economics 
The academic literature shows substantial evidence that trade unions reduce economic inequality. The economist Joseph Stiglitz has asserted that, "Strong unions have helped to reduce inequality, whereas weaker unions have made it easier for CEOs, sometimes working with market forces that they have helped shape, to increase it." The decline in unionization since the Second World War in the United States has been associated with a pronounced rise in income and wealth inequality and, since 1967, with loss of middle class income.
Right-to-work laws have been linked to greater economic inequality in the United States.

Research from Norway has found that high unionization rates lead to substantial increases in firm productivity, as well as increases in workers' wages. Research from Belgium also found productivity gains, although smaller. Other research in the United States has found that unions can harm profitability, employment and business growth rates. Research from the Anglosphere indicates that unions can provide wage premiums and reduce inequality while reducing employment growth and restricting employment flexibility.

In the United States, the outsourcing of labour to Asia, Latin America, and Africa has been partially driven by increasing costs of union partnership, which gives other countries a comparative advantage in labour, making it more efficient to perform labour-intensive work there. Trade unions have been accused of benefiting insider workers and those with secure jobs at the cost of outsider workers, consumers of the goods or services produced, and the shareholders of the unionized business. Milton Friedman, economist and advocate of laissez-faire capitalism, sought to show that unionization produces higher wages (for the union members) at the expense of fewer jobs, and that, if some industries are unionized while others are not, wages will tend to decline in non-unionized industries.

Politics 
In the United States, the weakening of unions has been linked to more favourable electoral outcomes for the Republican Party. Legislators in areas with high unionization rates are more responsive to the interests of the poor, whereas areas with lower unionization rates are more responsive to the interests of the rich. Higher unionization rates increase the likelihood of parental leave policies being adopted. Republican-controlled states are less likely to adopt more restrictive labour policies when unions are strong in the state.

Research in the United States found that American congressional representatives were more responsive to the interests of the poor in districts with higher unionization rates. Another 2020 American study found an association between US state level adoption of parental leave legislation and trade union strength.

In the United States, unions have been linked to lower racial resentment among whites. Membership in unions increases political knowledge, in particular among those with less formal education.

Health 
In the United States, higher union density has been associated with lower suicide/overdose deaths. Decreased unionisation rates in the United States have been linked to an increase in occupational fatalities.

See also 

 Critique of work
 Digital Product Passport
 Labor federation competition in the United States
 Labor Management Reporting and Disclosure Act
 Labour inspectorate
 List of trade unions
 Progressive Librarians Guild
 Project Labor Agreement
 Salt (union organizing)
 Smart contract: can be used in employment contracts
 Union busting
 Workplace politics

References

Bibliography

Further reading

 
 
 St. James Encyclopedia of Labor History Worldwide : Major Events in Labor History and Their Impact ed by Neil Schlager (2 vol. 2004)

Britain

 Aldcroft, D. H. and Oliver, M. J., eds. Trade Unions and the Economy, 1870–2000. (2000).
 Campbell, A., Fishman, N., and McIlroy, J. eds. British Trade Unions and Industrial Politics: The Post-War Compromise 1945–64 (1999).
 
  
  
 
 
 
 
 Wrigley, Chris, ed. British Trade Unions, 1945–1995 (Manchester University Press, 1997)

Europe

 Berghahn, Volker R., and Detlev Karsten. Industrial Relations in West Germany (Bloomsbury Academic, 1988).
 European Commission, Directorate General for Employment, Social Affairs & Inclusion: Industrial Relations in Europe 2010.
 Gumbrell-McCormick, Rebecca, and Richard Hyman. Trade unions in western Europe: Hard times, hard choices (Oxford UP, 2013).
 Kjellberg, Anders. "The Decline in Swedish Union Density since 2007", Nordic Journal of Working Life Studies (NJWLS) Vol. 1. No 1 (August 2011), pp. 67–93.
 Kjellberg, Anders (2017) The Membership Development of Swedish Trade Unions and Union Confederations Since the End of the Nineteenth Century (Studies in Social Policy, Industrial Relations, Working Life and Mobility). Research Reports 2017:2. Lund: Department of Sociology, Lund University.
 Markovits, Andrei. The Politics of West German Trade Unions: Strategies of Class and Interest Representation in Growth and Crisis (Routledge, 2016).
 McGaughey, Ewan, 'Democracy or Oligarchy? Models of Union Governance in the UK, Germany and US' (2017) ssrn.com
 Misner, Paul. Catholic Labor Movements in Europe. Social Thought and Action, 1914–1965 (2015). online review
 Mommsen, Wolfgang J., and Hans-Gerhard Husung, eds. The development of trade unionism in Great Britain and Germany, 1880–1914 (Taylor & Francis, 1985).
 Ribeiro, Ana Teresa. "Recent Trends in Collective Bargaining in Europe." E-Journal of International and Comparative Labour Studies 5.1 (2016). online 
 Upchurch, Martin, and Graham Taylor. The Crisis of Social Democratic Trade Unionism in Western Europe: The Search for Alternatives (Routledge, 2016).

United States

 Arnesen, Eric, ed. Encyclopedia of U.S. Labor and Working-Class History (2006), 3 vol; 2064pp; 650 articles by experts excerpt and text search
 Beik, Millie, ed. Labor Relations: Major Issues in American History (2005) over 100 annotated primary documents excerpt and text search
 Boris, Eileen, and Nelson Lichtenstein, eds. Major Problems In The History Of American Workers: Documents and Essays (2002)
 Brody, David. In Labor's Cause: Main Themes on the History of the American Worker (1993) excerpt and text search
 Guild, C. M. (2021). Union Library Workers Blog: The Years 2019-2020 in Review. Progressive Librarian, 48, 110–165.
 Dubofsky, Melvyn, and Foster Rhea Dulles. Labor in America: A History (2004), textbook, based on earlier textbooks by Dulles.
 Taylor, Paul F. The ABC-CLIO Companion to the American Labor Movement (1993) 237pp; short encyclopedia
 Zieger, Robert H., and Gilbert J. Gall, American Workers, American Unions: The Twentieth Century(3rd ed. 2002) excerpt and text search

Other

 Alexander, Robert Jackson, and Eldon M. Parker. A history of organized labor in Brazil (Greenwood, 2003).
 Dean, Adam. 2022. Opening Up By Cracking Down: Labor Repression and Trade Liberalization in Democratic Developing Countries. Cambridge University Press.
 Hodder, A. and L. Kretsos, eds. Young Workers and Trade Unions: A Global View (Palgrave-Macmillan, 2015). review
 Kester, Gérard. Trade unions and workplace democracy in Africa (Routledge, 2016).
 Lenti, Joseph U. Redeeming the Revolution: The State and Organized Labor in Post-Tlatelolco Mexico (University of Nebraska Press, 2017). 
 Levitsky, Steven, and Scott Mainwaring. "Organized labor and democracy in Latin America." Comparative Politics (2006): 21–42 online.
 Lipton, Charles (1967). The Trade Union Movement of Canada: 1827–1959. (3rd ed. Toronto, Ont.: New Canada Publications, 1973).
 Orr, Charles A. "Trade Unionism in Colonial Africa" Journal of Modern African Studies, 4 (1966), pp. 65–81
 Panitch, Leo & Swartz, Donald (2003). From consent to coercion: The assault on trade union freedoms (third edition. Ontario: Garamound Press).
 Taylor, Andrew. Trade Unions and Politics: A Comparative Introduction (Macmillan, 1989).
 Visser, Jelle. "Union membership statistics in 24 countries." Monthly Labor Review. 129 (2006): 38+ online
 Visser, Jelle. "ICTWSS: Database on institutional characteristics of trade unions, wage setting, state intervention and social pacts in 34 countries between 1960 and 2007." Institute for Advanced Labour Studies, AIAS, University of Amsterdam, Amsterdam (2011). online

External links

 Australian Council of Trade Unions
 LabourStart international trade union news service
 RadioLabour
 New Unionism Network 
 Trade union membership 1993–2003 – European Industrial Relations Observatory report on membership trends in 26 European countries
 Trade union membership 2003–2008 – European Industrial Relations Observatory report on membership trends in 28 European countries
 Trade Union Ancestors – Listing of 5,000 UK trade unions with histories of main organisations, trade union "family trees" and details of union membership and strikes since 1900.
 TUC History online – History of the British union movement
 Short history of the UGT in Catalonia
 Younionize Global Union Directory 
 Labor rights in the USA
 Labor Notes magazine

Labor relations